Azophi is a lunar impact crater that lies in the rugged south-central highlands of the Moon. The crater is named after the 10th-century Persian astronomer Abd Al-Rahman Al Sufi, also known by his western name, Azophi. The northwest rim is attached to the slightly smaller crater Abenezra, to the east-southeast is the large and irregular Sacrobosco, and to the west-southwest is Playfair.

The wide outer rim of Azophi has a somewhat polygonal shape with rounded corners. The edge is relatively sharp and cleft-like. The rim is not significantly worn or impacted by smaller craters, with the exception of Azophi C, which lies on the inner northeast wall. The interior floor lacks a central peak and is only marked by a few small craterlets.

Satellite craters 
By convention these features are identified on lunar maps by placing the letter on the side of the crater midpoint that is closest to Azophi.

See also 
 12621 Alsufi, asteroid named after Al Sufi (Azophi)

References

External links

Azophi at The Moon Wiki
 

Impact craters on the Moon